The Sandman: Endless Nights is a graphic novel written by Neil Gaiman as a follow-up to his Sandman series. The book is divided into seven chapters, each devoted to one of the Endless, a family of siblings who are physical manifestations of the metaphysical concepts Dream, Death, Desire, Destruction, Delirium, Despair and Destiny. It was published by DC Comics in 2003. It won the Bram Stoker Award for Best Illustrated Narrative. It is also the first comic book to ever be on the New York Times Bestseller List.

Each tale is stylistically different, and illustrated by a different artist. Most of the tales are independent of each other; however, Destruction's tale relates to and immediately follows Delirium's. Destruction and Delirium's tales are the only ones that take place after the events of the Sandman series.

In line with all the other Sandman comics, the cover, logo and book designs were created by Dave McKean.

Endless Nights was preceded by The Wake.

Chapters

Chapter 1: Death - Death and Venice
Art by P. Craig Russell

This story deals with the idea of quality versus quantity of life. It is split between two views: the lives of a group on an island off the coast of Venice protected by magic from Death versus the memories and thoughts of a young American (the conclusion suggests he is a special forces soldier) who has never forgotten his childhood encounter with her.

The story is narrated by a man in his late twenties/early thirties who seems to be disillusioned with the world around him. He walks around Venice speaking of time, illusion and trickery before seguing into an extended flashback of his childhood trip to Venice. While playing hide and seek he gets lost and meets Death of the Endless before a locked gate. She asks him to open it, which he attempts to do until finally he is found by his cousins hours later. They return to Venice with him in disgrace. The remaining story is his return to that gate, subsequent dealing with Death, musings on the facade of reality, his obsession with Death, and his general melancholy.

The name is derived from Thomas Mann's 1912 novella Death in Venice. The magician's desire on how to die from the beginning of the story was originally stated by Boris the bodyguard in Death: The Time of Your Life. The events in this story seem to be heavily influenced by Edgar Allan Poe's short story "The Masque Of The Red Death".  The island itself seems to be partially based on the real abandoned island of Poveglia.

Chapter 2: Desire - What I've Tasted of Desire
Art by Milo Manara

The title is probably taken from a line in Robert Frost's poem Fire and Ice. Gaiman himself has said that the story is based on a historical anecdote told by George MacDonald Fraser. A woman named Kara, living in an apparently pre-Roman Britain, becomes enamored of Danyal, a handsome neighbour. Danyal travels to the coast while his father goes to negotiate an exchange of hostages; upon the latter's failure, Kara sets out to tell the former that his father is dead. On the way she meets Desire, who promises to inspire an unbreakable longing in Danyal. As a result, he courts her for three months, until she consents to marry him. Unfortunately, he is killed soon afterward, and his killers come asking Kara for shelter, which she grants in obedience to cultural tradition. Upon seeing her husband's severed head, she manipulates his killers' desire for her and has them perform contests of strength, skill, and wit, distracting them until her own warriors return the following morning to kill them all. Thereafter, she no longer desires anything. She eventually remarries and dies of old age.

Chapter 3: Dream - The Heart of a Star
Art by Miguelanxo Prado

Near the beginning of the habitability of the universe, Dream and his new paramour Killalla of the Glow travel to a meeting of astronomical phenomena, wherein Killalla is astonished to identify the delegates as the very stars, galaxies, and dimensions which comprise the cosmos. At an encounter with her world's own sun, Sto-Oa, Killalla and the star fall in love at the behest of Desire,  while Dream watches. Here, Death acts cold and imperious and Delight has not become Delirium; whereas the defection of Killalla begins Dream's long-standing rivalry with Desire. The first aspect of Despair also appears in the story, quite different in appearance and more sociable than her latter aspect.

In addition, other DC comics characters appear: the character Killalla originates from the planet Oa (although technically from planet Maltus), and is an ancestor of the Guardians of the Universe, who form the Green Lantern Corps; able to manipulate their characteristic green energy, but with incomplete control. Despair has a conversation with a red giant star named Rao about the creation of life on an unstable world and the possibility of a lone survivor to continually mourn the destruction of that world: this is an allusion to the history of Superman, in that Rao is the red giant sun around which Superman's homeworld of Krypton orbited, as well as the Kryptonian God. (The colors of the stars in the story follow the DC Universe's standards, not the actual star life cycle.) The story is narrated by the Sun (here identified by his Latin name of Sol) to the Earth before the evolution there of life.

Elements of "Brief Lives" appear as well: the statement that the palace and its chambers will dissolve into light shows that "matter and light are interchangeable" (one of the reasons that Destruction abandoned his realm and responsibilities); Destruction also plays a "creator" role (elsewhere, he suggests that he and his siblings are both themselves and their polar opposites); Desire provokes distrust and hatred in Dream's heart; Death is declared inevitable (a reference to "The Illusion Of Permanence" in "Brief Lives"); and Delight's speech has already begun to resemble that of Delirium. In both "The Heart Of A Star" and "Brief Lives", characters comment on Destiny's blindness and, in both stories, it is shown that there are questions Destiny cannot answer (in the former, he asks Killalla if she loves Dream and, in the latter, he is unable to tell why Delight changed to Delirium).

Chapter 4: Despair - Fifteen Portraits of Despair
Art by Barron Storey, designed by Dave McKean

This collection of fifteen very short vignettes illustrates different aspects of Despair, either the character herself, the emotion in abstract, or people in a state of despair. One is about an unemployed man who's feeding cats, only to have them end up eating each other to survive when he goes on an extended leave for work. Another is about a priest who's being forcibly defrocked due to a molestation scandal, despite the fact that he can prove the allegations false. A third is about a woman who, after committing suicide to escape her pain, sits on the side of the road waiting for the happiness to begin.

In the Introduction, Neil Gaiman states that he had originally planned to write twenty-five "Portraits of Despair", but said "I think, on reflection, that it is probably a good thing that we only created fifteen".

Chapter 5: Delirium - Going Inside
Art by Bill Sienkiewicz

This story is about several mentally unbalanced people who are brought together on a quest to save Delirium from herself. It's possible at the end of this story that Delirium is somewhat healed in some fundamental way; at least two of the people involved in her rescue are also at least partly healed. Daniel/Dream, Dream's raven Matthew, and Barnabas (Delirium's dog protector on indefinite loan from Destruction), also appear as part of the rescue mission. One of the adventurers is based loosely on Henry Darger.

Chapter 6: Destruction - On the Peninsula
Art by Glenn Fabry

This is a story about a team of archaeologists who uncover and explore a peninsula from many years in the future. Chronologically, this takes place after Delirium's "Going Inside", the chapter preceding this one, featuring Delirium herself. Dialogue between Delirium and a human character indicate that the rift between Destruction and the rest of the Endless has been partially healed. The story is narrated by a female archaeologist who has constant dreams and waking dreams of the world in many post-apocalyptic forms, indicating that she belongs to Destruction's realm; this is echoed in the events of the story as she becomes deeply attracted to him while uncovering artifacts on the peninsula. According to Delirium, the artifacts the archaeologists uncover on the peninsula are not from the future, but a distortion of reality caused by Delirium and/or Destruction's presence in the area. In the end, the peninsula is mysteriously destroyed. The facts that Destruction may have caused the distortion of reality, that he has agreed to talk to his family again, and that the peninsula is ultimately destroyed may imply that he has come back to his functions and responsibilities.

Chapter 7: Destiny - Endless Nights
Art by Frank Quitely

This short story is simply a wander through Destiny's garden of forking paths. Based on the clothes of Delirium's statue in one of the panels and the posture of Dream's statue, it seems to be taking place during The Kindly Ones. This story was originally to be illustrated by Moebius. Neil Gaiman knew that, because of his age and health, the artist would not be able to give much of a time commitment so he designed this story to be short and full of full page pictures. In the end, sickness prevented Moebius from working on the story and Frank Quitely filled in.

References

Endless Nights
Fantasy comics
Vertigo Comics graphic novels
Eisner Award winners for Best Anthology
2003 American novels
Gothic comics